Peter Norfolk defeated David Wagner in the final, 7–6(7–5), 6–2 to win the inaugural quad singles wheelchair tennis title at the 2007 US Open.

Draw

Round robin

Final
Peter Norfolk versus David Wagner
Norfolk defeated Wagner in the round robin.

Wheelchair Quad Singles
U.S. Open, 2007 Quad Singles